"My Only Fascination" is a song by Greek singer Demis Roussos. It was released as a single in 1974.

The song was included on Roussos' 1974 album My Only Fascination.

Background and writing 
The song was written by Alec R. Costandinos and Stélios Vlavianós. The recording was produced by Demis Roussos.

Commercial performance 
The song reached no. 11  in Netherlands and in Belgium (Flanders) and.

Track listing 
7" single Philips 6009 479 (1974, Germany)
 A. "My Only Fascination" (3:41)
 B. "Someday Somewhere" (3:01)

7" single Philips 6009 474 (1974)
7" single Philips 6837 188 (1974, France)
 A. "My Only Fascination" (3:44)
 B. "Say You Love Me" (2:57)

Charts

References 

1974 songs
1974 singles
Demis Roussos songs
Philips Records singles
Songs written by Alec R. Costandinos
Song recordings produced by Demis Roussos
Songs written by Stélios Vlavianós